In geometry, the truncated tetrahedron is an Archimedean solid. It has 4 regular hexagonal faces, 4 equilateral triangle faces, 12 vertices and 18 edges (of two types). It can be constructed by truncating all 4 vertices of a regular tetrahedron at one third of the original edge length.

A deeper truncation, removing a tetrahedron of half the original edge length from each vertex, is called rectification. The rectification of a tetrahedron produces an octahedron.

A truncated tetrahedron is the Goldberg polyhedron  containing triangular and hexagonal faces.

A truncated tetrahedron can be called a cantic cube, with Coxeter diagram, having half of the vertices of the cantellated cube (rhombicuboctahedron), . There are two dual positions of this construction, and combining them creates the uniform compound of two truncated tetrahedra.

Area and volume
The area A and the volume V of a truncated tetrahedron of edge length a are:

Densest packing
The densest packing of the Archimedean truncated tetrahedron is believed to be Φ = , as reported by two independent groups using Monte Carlo methods. Although no mathematical proof exists that this is the best possible packing for the truncated tetrahedron, the high proximity to the unity and independency of the findings make it unlikely that an even denser packing is to be found. In fact, if the truncation of the corners is slightly smaller than that of an Archimedean truncated tetrahedron, this new shape can be used to completely fill space.

Cartesian coordinates
Cartesian coordinates for the 12 vertices of a truncated tetrahedron centered at the origin, with edge length √8, are all permutations of (±1,±1,±3) with an even number of minus signs:
(+3,+1,+1), (+1,+3,+1), (+1,+1,+3)
(−3,−1,+1), (−1,−3,+1), (−1,−1,+3)
(−3,+1,−1), (−1,+3,−1), (−1,+1,−3)
(+3,−1,−1), (+1,−3,−1), (+1,−1,−3)

Another simple construction exists in 4-space as cells of the truncated 16-cell, with vertices as coordinate permutation of:
(0,0,1,2)

Orthogonal projection

Spherical tiling
The truncated tetrahedron can also be represented as a spherical tiling, and projected onto the plane via a stereographic projection. This projection is conformal, preserving angles but not areas or lengths. Straight lines on the sphere are projected as circular arcs on the plane.

Friauf polyhedron 
A lower symmetry version of the truncated tetrahedron (a truncated tetragonal disphenoid with order 8 D2d symmetry) is called a Friauf polyhedron in crystals such as complex metallic alloys. This form fits 5 Friauf polyhedra around an axis, giving a 72-degree dihedral angle on a subset of 6-6 edges. It is named after J. B. Friauf and his 1927 paper "The crystal structure of the intermetallic compound MgCu2".

Uses
Giant truncated tetrahedra were used for the "Man the Explorer" and "Man the Producer" theme pavilions in Expo 67. They were made of massive girders of steel bolted together in a geometric lattice. The truncated tetrahedra were interconnected with lattice steel platforms. All of these buildings were demolished after the end of Expo 67, as they had not been built to withstand the severity of the Montreal weather over the years. Their only remnants are in the Montreal city archives, the Public Archives Of Canada and the photo collections of tourists of the times.

The Tetraminx puzzle has a truncated tetrahedral shape. This puzzle shows a dissection of a truncated tetrahedron into 4 octahedra and 6 tetrahedra. It contains 4 central planes of rotations.

Truncated tetrahedral graph

In the mathematical field of graph theory, a truncated tetrahedral graph is an Archimedean graph, the graph of vertices and edges of the truncated tetrahedron, one of the Archimedean solids. It has 12 vertices and 18 edges. It is a connected cubic graph, and connected cubic transitive graph.

Related polyhedra and tilings

It is also a part of a sequence of cantic polyhedra and tilings with vertex configuration 3.6.n.6. In this wythoff construction the edges between the hexagons represent degenerate digons.

Symmetry mutations
This polyhedron is topologically related as a part of sequence of uniform truncated polyhedra with vertex configurations (3.2n.2n), and [n,3] Coxeter group symmetry.

Examples

See also
Quarter cubic honeycomb – Fills space using truncated tetrahedra and smaller tetrahedra
Truncated 5-cell – Similar uniform polytope in 4-dimensions
Truncated triakis tetrahedron
Triakis truncated tetrahedron
Octahedron – a rectified tetrahedron

References

 (Section 3-9)

External links

 

Editable printable net of a truncated tetrahedron with interactive 3D view
The Uniform Polyhedra
Virtual Reality Polyhedra The Encyclopedia of Polyhedra

Archimedean solids
Truncated tilings
Individual graphs
Planar graphs